is a Japanese manga series written by Kenji Saitō and illustrated by Shinshū Ueda. It is a spin-off to Masami Kurumada's original manga series  Saint Seiya. The manga started in Akita Shoten's seinen manga magazine Champion Red in December 2020.

Plot
The story follows Shōichirō, an ordinary high school boy, who after a certain incident wakes up in the land of the dead, where he discovers that he was chosen to become one of the 108 Specters of Hades, one of the three Judges of the Underworld, the dark dragon Wyvern.

Characters

Athena's Army
  is a childhood friend of Shōichirō and Sōjirō, a cheerful young girl who always has a smile on her face. She was a second year student at Graad International University High School and her major within the school was archery. Although she lived most of her life as an ordinary young girl, she is the reincarnation of the goddess Athena during this time, something she discovers on the same boat trip in which her friend Shōichirō dies and after awakening as a goddess uses her power to save a large number of students. After this event, Cattleya is taken to the Sanctuary, where she is introduced to the Gold Saints as Athena and her destiny as a goddess is revealed to her. The goddess Athena is the leader of the Saints and will fight alongside them in the upcoming battle against Hades and his army to protect peace in the world.

Gold Saints

Hades's Army
 Hades
  is the reincarnation of Pandora, the faithful follower of Hades and the woman who commands the army of this god. When she was a child, she and her younger brother received the sight of the god Hypnos, who chose her brother as the host of Hades' soul and awakened Pandora's soul in her to protect Hades. Hypnos also assigned Charlotte (a young Specter girl of Yoruhime's age) to help Yoruhime protect Hades, this young girl became Yoruhime's best friend. Some time later, Yoruhime and Charlotte would enter the Graad International University High School as students to watch over Cattleya (the reincarnation of Athena) in secret, in this place Yoruhime would stand out for her singing ability and would meet Shōichirō, a young student with whom she seems to have fallen in love. Yoruhime's life as a student was normal for two years, until a mysterious enemy attacked the boat on the trip organized by the school and also attacked the Underworld (the land of the dead) destroying this place along with a lot of souls and Specters that were there. After this event, Yoruhime and Shoichiro are transferred to Elysium (the land of the dead), where she awaits Shōichirō's awakening and prepares Hades' army for the upcoming battle against Athena, whom she holds responsible for the attack on the boat and the destruction of the Underworld.

Judges of the Underworld
He was a second-year student at Graad International University High School and his major within the school was playing the piano. At school he met Yoruhime, a young student with whom he seems to have fallen in love. On a boat trip organized by the school, Shoichiro is having fun with his friends, but a strange beam of light hits the boat, causing it to start sinking, during the commotion he tries to save Yoruhime, but they both fall overboard from the boat into the sea. As they sink into the water, Shoichiro wishes he had the power to save Yoruhime, at that moment a Wynver appears in front of them and devours them. A year after this event, Shoichiro wakes up in Elysium (the land of the dead), where he discovers that he was chosen to be part of Hades' army.

Specters

Others

Publication
Written by Kenji Saitō and illustrated by Shinshū Ueda, Saint Seiya: Meiō Iden - Dark Wing started in Akita Shoten's seinen manga magazine Champion Red on December 19, 2020. Akita Shoten has collected its chapters into individual tankōbon volumes. The first volume was released on June 18, 2021.

Volume list

Chapters not yet in tankōbon format
 011. , published on January 19, 2022.
 012. , published on February 19, 2022.
 013. , published on March 19, 2022.
 014. , published on April 19, 2022
 015. , published on May 19, 2022
 016. , published on June 17, 2022
 017. , published on July 19, 2022

See also
 Trinity Seven, another manga series by the same writer

References

External links
Official manga website 

Akita Shoten manga
Comics spin-offs
Isekai anime and manga
Meiō Iden - Dark Wing
Seinen manga